Ageratina paupercula,  called the Santa Rita snakeroot, is a North American species of shrubs or perennial herbs in the family Asteraceae. It is found only in the states of Arizona, Sonora, Chihuahua, Durango, Nayarit, and Jalisco.

Etymology
Ageratina is derived from Greek meaning 'un-aging', in reference to the flowers keeping their color for a long time. This name was used by Dioscorides for a number of different plants.

The epithet paupercula is feminine of pauperculus, Latin for "poor."

The "Santa Rita" part of the common name refers to the Santa Rita Mountains in southern Arizona, south of Tucson, where the species was initially discovered.

References

paupercula
Flora of the Southwestern United States
Plants described in 1882
Flora of Northwestern Mexico
Flora of Southwestern Mexico
Flora of Northeastern Mexico